The Gaithersburg Book Festival is an annual literary festival held in Gaithersburg, Maryland, United States started in 2010. It was conceived of by city council member Jud Ashman, with the support of the mayor and city council and the Cultural Arts Advisory Committee. The one day event has been held each year on the grounds of Olde Towne Gaithersburg and is free to attend.

There was a virtual festival in 2020. Live events were cancelled.

External links

References 

Literary festivals in the United States
Book fairs in the United States
Festivals in Maryland
Recurring events established in 2010
Annual events in Maryland